Jim Britt (April 11, 1910 – December 31, 1980) was an American sportscaster who broadcast Major League Baseball games in Boston, Massachusetts, and Cleveland, Ohio, during the 1940s and 1950s. On June 15, 1948, Britt was at the microphone on WBZ-TV for the first live telecast of a Major League game in New England, as the Boston Braves defeated the Chicago Cubs, 6–3, at Braves Field.

A native of San Francisco, California, Britt graduated from the University of Detroit and began his broadcasting career in Michigan before taking on play-by-play announcing for the University of Notre Dame's football and basketball teams, then the Buffalo Bisons minor league baseball club. He joined the air staff of Boston's WNAC radio in 1939.

Boston Braves and Red Sox
From 1940 through 1950, with time out for United States Navy service in World War II, Britt was the voice of both the National League Boston Braves (officially the "Bees" from 1936–1940) and the American League Boston Red Sox, succeeding Baseball Hall of Fame second baseman and manager Frankie Frisch as play-by-play broadcaster when Frisch returned to uniform as pilot of the 1940 Pittsburgh Pirates. Britt also hosted an evening sports show on WNAC.

At the time, the Braves and Red Sox each broadcast only their home games and shared announcing teams and flagship stations. Because the MLB schedules were then arranged so that the two Boston clubs were never home at the same time, there were no schedule conflicts. As such, Britt was the voice of two pennant-winning clubs, the 1946 Red Sox and the 1948 Braves. At the close of the 1950 season, that co-operative arrangement ended and each team decided to air a full schedule of 154 games, home and away. Britt chose to stay with the Braves, and the Red Sox were left to look for their own lead announcer.

As fate would have it, the Sox would hire the "second banana" for the New York Yankees — a Mel Allen protégé named Curt Gowdy — who would be the voice of the Red Sox for 15 years before moving on to NBC's Game of the Week and a place in the Baseball Hall of Fame as a Ford C. Frick Award winner. Meanwhile, the Braves' attendance fell disastrously in 1951 and 1952, and the club moved to Milwaukee in March 1953, in the middle of spring training.

Cleveland Indians and national work
Britt did not accompany the Braves to Wisconsin. Instead, he joined the TV announcing crew of the Cleveland Indians in 1954, working through 1957 with Ken Coleman, a native of the Boston area (and Gowdy's eventual successor, in 1966, as voice of the Red Sox). The highlight of Britt's Cleveland tenure was the Indians' 1954 American League pennant with their league-record 111–43 season (one game better than the 110–44 1927 Yankees). But the Indians were upset in four straight games by the New York Giants in the ensuing 1954 World Series.

Nationally, Britt participated in the Mutual network radio coverage of the World Series in 1948 and 1950, and worked on NBC's television coverage of the Series in 1949 and 1951. He also announced several baseball All-Star Games in the late 1940s and early '50s, as well as NFL games on the DuMont network and college football coverage (including the 1953 Sugar Bowl game) on ABC.

Return to Boston
Britt returned to Boston in the late 1950s as a newscaster and sportscaster for the city's ABC affiliate, then WHDH-TV, Channel 5, which also telecast Red Sox games; but he never regained his former role announcing for the team. Instead, he initiated a popular candlepin bowling show he would host until 1966, and also hosted Dateline: Boston (a nonsports predecessor to many of the modern-day magazine-style television programs) and an ABC-TV network series of hourlong 18-hole matches between two golfers called All-Star Golf featuring the best of their time including Ben Hogan, Sammy Snead, Lloyd Mangrum and Billy Casper.

In retirement he eventually returned to his native California, where he died, aged 70, in Monterey.

References

1910 births
1980 deaths
United States Navy personnel of World War II
American radio sports announcers
American television sports announcers
Boston sportscasters
Boston Braves announcers
Boston Red Sox announcers
Bowling broadcasters
Cleveland Indians announcers
College basketball announcers in the United States
College football announcers
Major League Baseball broadcasters
Minor League Baseball broadcasters
National Football League announcers
Notre Dame Fighting Irish football announcers
New York Giants announcers
People from San Francisco
University of Detroit Mercy alumni
University of Southern California alumni